Condor is the common name for two species of New World vultures, each in a monotypic genus. The name derives from the Quechua kuntur.  They are the largest flying land birds in the Western Hemisphere.

They are:

 The Andean condor (Vultur gryphus), which inhabits the Andean  mountains.
 The California condor (Gymnogyps californianus), currently restricted to the western coastal mountains of the United States and Mexico and the northern desert mountains of Arizona in the United States.

Taxonomy
Condors are part of the family Cathartidae which contains the New World vultures, whereas the 15 species of Old World vultures are in the family Accipitridae, that also includes hawks, eagles, and kites. The New World and Old World vultures evolved from different ancestors. They both are carrion-eaters and the two groups are similar in appearance due to convergent evolution.

Description

Both condors are very large broad-winged soaring birds, the Andean condor being  shorter (beak to tail) on average than the northern species, but heavier and larger in wingspan. The Andean condor has a wingspan of 2.7-3.2 metres and a weight of 7.7–15 kg. with the California condor weight of 9-11 kg, and wingspan of 2.89 metres (9.5 feet). California condors are the largest flying land birds in North America. Among all living flying birds, the Andean condor is the third heaviest after the Kori bustard and great bustard (up to ), and second only to the wandering albatross (up to ) in wingspan.

The adult plumage is uniformly black, with the exception of a frill of white feathers nearly surrounding the base of the neck which are meticulously kept clean by the bird. As an adaptation for hygiene, the condor's head and neck have few feathers, which exposes the skin to the sterilizing effects of dehydration and solar ultraviolet light at high altitudes. The head is much flattened above. In the male it is crowned with a caruncle or comb, while the skin of the neck in the male lies in folds, forming a wattle. The skin of the head and neck is capable of flushing noticeably in response to emotional state, which serves to communicate between individuals.

The middle toe is greatly elongated, and the hinder one but slightly developed, while the talons of all the toes are comparatively straight and blunt. The feet are thus more adapted to walking as in their relatives the storks , and of little use as weapons or organs of prehension as in birds of prey and Old World vultures. The female, contrary to the usual rule among birds of prey, is smaller than the male.

Overall length can range from  Measurements are usually taken from specimens reared in captivity.

The skin on the necks will vary in color, depending on the age of the birds. Adult birds' skin color can range from cream, pink, yellow, or even orange during breeding season.

Fossil record

Fossils of both extinct and extant condor species from the Pleistocene era have been found in various parts of North America, including New York and Florida, leading scientists to hypothesize that California condors (as well as their ancestors and relatives) once lived on the west coast of North America as well as all the way to the eastern coast, until their eventual extinction/extirpation.

Behavior

Sexual maturity and breeding behavior do not appear in the condor until 5 or 6 years of age. They may live for 50 years or more, and mate for life. The world's oldest condor died at 100 in the Jardin d'Essai du Hamma in Algiers.

The young are covered with a grayish down until they are almost as large as their parents. They are able to fly after six months, but continue to roost and hunt with their parents until age two, when they are displaced by a new clutch. There is a well-developed social structure within large groups of condors, recent study showed the 'pecking order' is determined by age group and, within age groups, by sex(which contradicts previous findings).

On the wing the movements of the condor are graceful. The lack of a large sternum to anchor correspondingly large flight muscles identifies it physiologically as a primary soarer. The birds flap their wings on rising from the ground, but after attaining a moderate elevation they seem to sail on the air, transiting from one upstream to the next often without flapping its wings.

Wild condors inhabit large territories, often traveling  a day in search of carrion. They prefer large carcasses such as deer or cattle which they spot by looking for other scavengers, which cannot rip through the tougher hides of these larger animals with the efficiency of the larger condor. In the wild they are intermittent eaters, often going for a few days without eating, then gorging themselves on several kilograms (pounds) at once, sometimes to the point of being unable to lift off the ground.

Other

The Moche people of ancient Peru worshiped nature. They placed emphasis on animals and often depicted condors in their art. The Andean Condor lives for a long age, 50 years and it has been said that in the wild they can live to 60 years of age.

Gallery

References

External links

 BirdLife Species Factsheet Andean Condor
 BirdLife Species Factsheet California Condor 
 California Condor Conservation
 Scientists Work to Repopulate Colombia's Skies with Condors - slideshow by the Los Angeles Times
 Ventana Wildlife Society: Condor Recovery

New World vultures
Cathartidae
Scavengers
Bird common names
Extant Piacenzian first appearances

bpy:কোনডোর্
no:Kondorer